Griboyedov (until 1978, Aralikh Kyolanlu) is a town in the Armavir Province of Armenia. The town is named in honor of Russian writer and diplomat Alexandr Griboyedov.

See also 
Armavir Province

References 

World Gazeteer: Armenia – World-Gazetteer.com

Populated places in Armavir Province